Ultimatum  is a 2009 French-Israeli-Italian drama film co-written and directed by Alain Tasma, starring Gaspard Ulliel and Jasmine Trinca. The film was released in France on 30 September 2009 by Mars Distribution.

Plot
1990, New Year's Eve; the United Nations calls on Iraq to withdraw its soldiers from Kuwait on pain of NATO military intervention. In the West, people imagine the possibility of a third world war, while in Jerusalem, there are concerns about chemical and biological weapons.

Luisa, a 23-year-old Franco-Italian, studies ancient history in Jerusalem. Nathanaël, also 23, is a painter and works as a security guard in East Jerusalem. As Saddam Hussein threatens to launch SCUD missiles at Israel, the young couple deals with the ramifications of world events on their relationship.

Cast and characters
 Gaspard Ulliel as Nathanaël
 Jasmine Trinca as Luisa
 Michel Boujenah as Victor
 Anna Galiena as Rachel
 Sarah Adler as Tamar
 Hana Laszlo as Bella
 Lior Ashkenazi as Gil

References

External links
 

2009 films
2009 drama films
French drama films
Israeli drama films
Italian drama films
Films shot in Israel
Films set in Israel
French multilingual films
2009 multilingual films
2000s French films
2000s Italian films